Zadeh, also Zada, is a Persian patronymic suffix meaning 'descendant of' or 'born of' used in names mainly in Iran and Azerbaijan.

Notable people whose names contain 'Zadeh' include:

Lotfi A. Zadeh (1921–2017), mathematician, electrical engineer, and computer scientist

Mirza Fatali Akhundzadeh (1812–1878), Azerbaijani author, playwright, and philosopher
Franghiz Ali-Zadeh (born 1947), Soviet and Azerbaijani composer and pianist
Rafael Amen-Zadeh (born 1943), Soviet and Azerbaijani mathematician and physicist

Hashem Beikzadeh (born 1984), Iranian footballer

Sadegh Ghotbzadeh (1936-1982), Iranian politician

Masoud Hashemzadeh (born 1981), Iranian wrestler
T. J. Houshmandzadeh (born 1977), American NFL football player

Abbas Ibrahim Zada, Afghanistani politician

Kamyar Kalantar-Zadeh (born 1963), American physician and medical researcher

Jalil Mammadguluzadeh (1866–1932), Azerbaijani satirist and writer
Aziza Mustafazadeh (born 1969), Soviet and Azerbaijani singer, pianist, and composer
Vagif Mustafazadeh (1940–1979), Azerbaijani jazz pianist and composer

Hossein Rezazadeh (born 1978), Iranian politician, retired Olympic weightlifter, and world record holder

Kazem Sadegh-Zadeh (born 1942), Iranian and German philosopher of medicine
Ilya Salmanzadeh (born 1986), Swedish music producer
Aysel Teymurzadeh (born 1989), Azerbaijani singer
Kanan Yusif-zada, Azebaijani surgeon

See also
Zadeh, a common element (i.e., that sequence, though not necessarily with the initial letter in upper-case) in Iranian names and toponyms -- Hence, see , although due to technical considerations it will omit most of the many instances where that letter is immediately preceded, not by either a hyphen or white-space, but by a letter of the alphabet.
Zada (suffix)

Persian-language surnames
Iranian-language surnames
Azerbaijani-language surnames
Surnames
Patronymics